The 1931–32 season was the 5th season of competitive football in the British Mandate for Palestine under the Eretz Israel Football Association.

IFA Competitions

1931–32 Palestine League

The first Palestine League season was opened on  November 1931 and ended on 27 May 1932. Winners were British Police. During the season the first (and second) league derbies of Tel Aviv and Haifa were played. In Tel Aviv the first match has ended with a 1–1 draw, while Hapoel won the second match 5–1. In Haifa, Hapoel won both matches, 5–0 and 7–2.

1932 Palestine Cup

The 1932 Palestine Cup was won by British Police, who were awarded the final match, after it was abandoned on the 37th minute due to protest of Hapoel Haifa after the referee awarded the Police a penalty kick.

Final

Notable Events
 In the 1932 Maccabiah Games, two football matches were played between Maccabi teams from Eretz Israel (composed of Maccabi players only) and Poland. The first match between the teams ended in a 2–2 draw, while Poland won the second match 3–2. A further friendly match between the sides ended with a 4–2 victory to Eretz Israel.

References